Urgell is a Barcelona Metro station, named after the Carrer del Comte d'Urgell, in the Eixample district of the city of Barcelona. The station is served by line L1.

The station is located under the Gran Via de les Corts Catalanes between the Carrer del Comte d'Urgell and the Carrer de Villarroel. The station can be accessed from entrances on the Gran Via, the Comte d'Urgell and the Carrer de Villarroel.

Urgell is one of the oldest metro stations in the city, as it is part of the first section of line L1 (then the Ferrocarril Metropolitano Transversal de Barcelona) between Catalunya and Bordeta stations, which was opened in 1926.

See also
List of Barcelona Metro stations
Urgell (the comarca or county the station is ultimately named after).
Counts of Urgell

References

External links

Barcelona Metro line 1 stations
Railway stations in Spain opened in 1926
Railway stations located underground in Spain